Buyangiin Ganbat (born 8 November 1945) is a Mongolian boxer. He competed in the men's bantamweight event at the 1972 Summer Olympics.

References

1945 births
Living people
Mongolian male boxers
Olympic boxers of Mongolia
Boxers at the 1972 Summer Olympics
Place of birth missing (living people)
Asian Games medalists in boxing
Boxers at the 1974 Asian Games
Asian Games bronze medalists for Mongolia
Medalists at the 1974 Asian Games
Bantamweight boxers
21st-century Mongolian people
20th-century Mongolian people